Khalid bin Hamad Al Khalifa (born 13 September 1989) is a member of the Bahraini royal family, and a Bahraini military officer. He is the fourth line of the heir apparent.

Early life and education
Khalid bin Hamad was born on 13 September 1989, the fifth son of the Bahraini ruler, King Hamad, with Sheia bint Hassan Al Khrayyesh Al Ajmi of Kuwait, the king’s second wife.

He attended Ibn Khuldoon National School and then graduated from Royal Military Academy Sandhurst in August 2008.

Career
He is a military officer with the rank Major and command Royal Guard's Rapid Intervention Force. He is the president of the Bahrain Royal Equestrian and Endurance Federation and the first deputy chairman of the Supreme Council for Youth and Sports.

Mixed Martial Arts 
He partook in two amateur MMA bouts in 2016 and 2017, winning his debut via TKO in the first round against Aditya PS, and his second bout via unanimous decision against Manish Kumar.

Personal life
Khalid bin Hamad married Sahab bint Abdullah Al Saud (born 14 February 1993), daughter of Saudi Arabia's former ruler King Abdullah, on 16 June 2011 in Riyadh. Khalid and Sahab divorced in 2017. The couple had two sons:
Faisal (born 12 December 2012)
Abdullah (born 6 February 2015) 

In 2017, Al Khalifa married Hessa, daughter of Mohammed bin Isa Al Khalifa, the chief of the National Guard.

Ancestry

References

1989 births
Asian Games medalists in equestrian
Asian Games silver medalists for Bahrain
Bahraini military personnel
Equestrians at the 2006 Asian Games
Graduates of the Royal Military Academy Sandhurst
Khalid bin Hamad Al
Living people
Medalists at the 2006 Asian Games
Khalid
Bahraini male mixed martial artists